{{Infobox rail line
| box_width                       = 300
| name                            = Port Klang-Kota Bharu East Coast Rail Line
| native_name                     = Laluan Rel Pantai Timur Pelabuhan Klang-Kota Bharu| native_name_lang                = ms
| color                           = 
| logo                            = 
| logo_width                      = 150px
| image                           = File:CJ6-0601@BCR (20170328163813).jpg
| image_width                     = 355px
| caption                         = CRRC Zhuzhou CJ6-type EMU proposed for inter-city rail line passenger services.
| type                            = Inter-city rail & Rail freight transport
| stations                        = 20
| daily_ridership                 = 
| ridership2                      = 5.40 million by 2030 (estimated)
| status                          = Under construction 40% as of 22 February 2023 
| website                         = 
| mapcolour                       = 
| linelength                      =  Double Tracking Line on Double Tracking Formation.| locale                          = Section A : Kota Bharu – Pasir Puteh –  Jerteh - Bandar Permaisuri – Kuala Terengganu  Section B : Dungun – Kemasik – Chukai – Cherating – Kuantan Port City – KotaSAS – Gambang – Maran  Section C :  Temerloh – Bentong – Gombak – Serendah – Puncak Alam – Kapar – Northport/Westport
| open                            = 
| planopen                        = 2027
| depot                           = Kuantan Port City
| stock                           = 6-car set EMU
| speed                           = 160 km/h (passenger train)80 km/h (freight train)
| gauge                           = 
| electrification                 =  Overhead line
| conductionsystem                = With driver
| operator                        = Malaysia Rail Link Sdn Bhd & CCCC Joint Venture
| owner                           = Malaysia Rail Link Sdn Bhd
| map                             = 
| map_state                       = collapsed
}}

The East Coast Rail Link (ECRL) (Malay: Laluan Rel Pantai Timur'') is a standard gauge double-track railway link infrastructure project connecting Port Klang on the Straits of Malacca to Kota Bharu in northeast Peninsular Malaysia, connecting the East Coast Economic Region states of Pahang, Terengganu and Kelantan to one another, and to the Central Region of the Peninsular's west coast.

The railway link infrastructure project would carry both passengers and freight from the West Coast of Peninsular Malaysia to its East Coast and vice versa. Construction began in August 2017.

On 3 July 2018, Malaysia Rail Link Sdn Bhd (MRL) instructed China Communications Construction Company (CCCC) to suspend all works under the engineering, procurement, construction and commissioning contract (EPCC) of the ECRL project. The suspension was then lifted few months later after signing of a supplementary agreement between MRL and CCCC in April 2019 on the revised construction cost and realignment of the southern route of the rail link.

Project proposal

Infrastructure
The project provides for the double tracking and standard gauge railway line. The infrastructure includes spur lines, tunnels, bridges, viaducts, depots, stations and a signalling system.

Board of directors
 Chairman: Mohammad Zuki Ali
 Director: Fauzi Abdul Rahman

Services
According to the first realignment, the inter-city passenger trains will use 6 car-train sets for EMUs travelling at 160 km per hour, cutting travel time from Kota Bharu to Putrajaya and Port Klang to around four and six hours respectively. The freight (cargo) trains use electric locomotives running at 80 km per hour.

Meanwhile, for international freight service from China to Europe via Malaysia, the original alignment of ECRL is expected to help reduce the shipping time by as much as 30 hours.

Stations

The project provides 20 stations, comprising 14 passenger stations, 5 combined passenger and freight stations, and 1 freight station.

North extention
Pengkalan Kubur (proposed, passenger only)
Wakaf Bharu (proposed, passenger and freight)

Section A
Kota Bharu (elevated, passenger only)
Pasir Puteh (passenger only)
Jerteh (passenger only)
Bandar Permaisuri (passenger only)
Kuala Terengganu (actually located in Marang District, passenger only)
Pengkalan Berangan (proposed, passenger only)
Dungun (passenger and freight)

Section B
Kemasik – Chukai – Cherating – Kuantan Port City – Kuantan Port City 2 – KotaSAS – Gambang – Maran

Section C (northern line)
Tenerloh
Gombak
Serendah Baru (passenger and freight)
Puncak Alam (passenger)
Kapar (proposed, passenger)
Jalan Kastam (passenger and freight)

Section C (Southern spurline)
Temerloh (passenger and freight)
Kemasul (proposed, passenger only)
Klawang (passenger only)
Nilai Sentral (elevated, passenger only)
Putrajaya Sentral (elevated, passenger only)
Jenjarom (passenger and freight)
Westport

Project background
The project forms part of China's Belt and Road Initiative. On 15 March 2016, Suruhanjaya Pengangkutan Awam Darat (SPAD) and East Coast Economic Region Development Council (ECERDC), conducting a marketing exercise to gauge market interest, and seek views and ideas for the ECRL via a Request for Information (RFI).

In November 2016, a framework finance deal and construction agreement, valued at USD13.1 billion, was signed by the Malaysian Government and the state-owned China Communications Construction Company Ltd (CCCC). The deal was criticised by Prime Minister Mahathir Mohamed as being lopsided. “When it involves giving contracts to China, borrowing huge sums of money from China, and the contract goes to China, and China contractors prefer to use their own workers from China, use everything imported from China, even the payment is not made here, it's made in China ... that kind of contract is not something that I welcome”.

Starting 8 March 2017, the plan is opened for public inspection for three months at Land Public Transport Commission (SPAD) head office and 38 other locations including district offices.

The 3-month Public Inspection for Phase One of the ECRL received some 95 percent approval from 17,000 respondents across 15 east coast districts. SPAD had granted approval for Phase One of the ECRL railway schedule on 23 June 2017 which covers about 600 km of track. An Environmental Impact Assessment Report for the ECRL has also been completed and endorsed by the Department of Environment on 20 June 2017.

On 9 August 2017, then Prime Minister Najib Razak presided at the groundbreaking ceremony in Pahang state, marking the beginning of construction. He said "The construction of this rail link is in line with the government's initiative for efficient national infrastructure as well as connecting towns and upgrading public transport in the rural areas of the east coast."

Upon the change of government due 2018 Malaysian general election, the newly-elected Pakatan Harapan government initially decided to cancel the project citing high cost as the main factor. However, instead of cancellation, the ECRL route was then realigned with major changes made on the Section C route between Port Klang and Mentakab, Pahang.

After the fall of Pakatan Harapan government due to Sheraton move, the new Perikatan Nasional is planning to revert the ECRL route back to its original alignment.

Railway alignment
[
  {
    "type": "ExternalData",
    "service": "geoline",
    "ids": "Q24896324",
    "properties": {
      "stroke": "#1864B7",
      "stroke-width": 6
    }
  },
  {
    "type": "Feature",
    "geometry": { "type": "Point", "coordinates": [102.2286, 6.0549] },
    "properties": {
      "title": "Kota Bharu",
      "description": "",
      "marker-symbol": "rail-metro",
      "marker-size": "small",
      "marker-color": "1864B7"
    }
  }
]

Original alignment

Phase 1
The proposed alignment for Phase 1 of the railway features 22 stations running along a 600.3 km route. The new rail link is projected to connect passengers from Kota Bharu in Kelantan to ITT Gombak in Selangor in less than four hours.

It will start north of Kuala Lumpur at the Integrated Transport Terminal Gombak (ITT Gombak), the future interchange with the Kelana Jaya Line and main long-distance bus terminal. From the Klang Valley the line will run east through the state of Pahang, serving the towns of Bentong, Mentakab, Maran and Gambang, KotaSAS before reaching the state capital, Kuantan where there will be two stations namely Kuantan Port City 2 (freight) and Kuantan Port City 1 (passenger).

From Kuantan, the line will turn north to Cherating before entering the state of Terengganu, where it will serve the towns of Chukai, Kemasik, Kerteh (Provisional), Dungun, Pengkalan Berangan, state capital Kuala Terengganu as well as via Telaga Papan and Kampung Raja area.

The ECRL will continue north into Kelantan, serving stations at Tok Bali and Jelawat, before ending at Kota Bharu.

The rail link includes a total of 50 km of tunnelling and underground alignment. The tunnelling works will be carried out along the Gombak-Bentong area where the single-longest twin hill-tunnel spanning 18 km will be built under the Titiwangsa Mountains. There will also be several underground lines, including in the heavily populated Gombak area near the Kuala Lumpur city centre.

Phase 2
Phase 2 of ECRL will have an estimated length of 88 km. This phase will cover the stretch from Gombak North to Port Klang through  and two more future station located at Puncak Alam and Kapar. As well, a further extension between Kota Bharu and Pengkalan Kubor will also be built. The cost of construction for this section of the ECRL is RM9 billion. With Phase 1 and Phase 2 combined, the total length of the entire line is about 688 km and the construction cost amounting to RM55 billion.

First realignment
Due to the change of government in 2018, the new Pakatan Harapan government initially planned to cancel the project but instead decided to realign the route especially on the Section C between Port Klang and Mentakab, Pahang. This realignment would add extra two hours of travelling time between Kota Bharu to Port Klang from the original four hours to six hours.

Below are the new changes made due to the realignment.
Double tracking from Port Klang to Kota Bharu bypass Gombak and Bentong.
Standard gauges were used and the maximum speed for passenger is 160 km/h and for freight is 80 km/h.
The number of stations reduced to 20 and these stations had been removed from list:
Pengkalan Kubor, Tumpat
Wakaf Bharu, Tumpat
Jelawat, Bachok
Telaga Papan, Setiu
Kerteh, Kemaman
Kuantan Sentral, Paya Besar
Bentong
Gombak North, Gombak
ITT Gombak, Kuala Lumpur
Serendah, Hulu Selangor
Puncak Alam, Kuala Selangor
Kapar, Klang
Northport, Klang

and the following stations were shifted to another place or new stations:
Kota Bharu station will be located near Kampung Tunjong, passed through Melor town and portion of Bachok District land, and then will reached Pasir Puteh station and go ahead to Jerteh station via tunnel.
Kuala Terengganu station, formerly situated at Kuala Nerus, was shifted to Marang District near Wakaf Tapai.
Pengkalan Berangan station which formerly situated at Marang south was shifted to Marang west, making it nearer Marang town, and become a proposed station.
Temerloh station will be integrated with current KTMB Mentakab via spur line.
Klawang station will be located at Kampung Seperi, Kuala Klawang, Negeri Sembilan
Nilai Sentral station will be integrated with new KTMB komuter station.
Putrajaya Sentral station will be integrated with the current station via spur line, the section at Putrajaya will be elevated and pass Presint 14, 1 and 9.
Jenjarom station which is located at oil palm area.
Westpost station, as a terminal freight station at Pulau Indah

The estimated date of completion was also extended for more than two years to the end of December 2026, compared to the originally targeted date of June 2024.

Second realignment
Due to another change of government from Pakatan Harapan to Perikatan Nasional in 2020, the Perikatan Nasional government is planning to revert the ECRL route back to its original alignment.

In March 2021, the second realignment is confirmed with the reversion of the alignment to its original alignment with added improvement by passing through Serendah and linking Port Klang with West and North Port. The decision was said to enable the construction of a meter gauge bypass line from Serendah to Port Klang for Keretapi Tanah Melayu Bhd (KTMB) to be included into the new ECRL alignment. Section C alignment from Serendah - Port Klang will be on dual gauge (MRL - , KTM - ). The bypass line will make the KTMB rail services more efficient as it serves as a significant freight relief line to the KTMB which currently faces bottlenecks when traversing Kuala Lumpur's central business district (CBD) and relieves the concerns for public safety as KTMB cargo containing hazardous materials need to go through KL Sentral, Bank Negara and several other stations due to the freight congestion.

This latest realignment will add 25 km more of rail tracks totaling to 665 km.

The alignment was confirmed on 2 December 2021 after the Selangor state government agreed to having the original northern alignment known as Section C. The project cost remains unchanged at RM50.27b, with supplementary agreements signed to formalise the alignment.

Fleet

Passenger EMU
Passenger services will be operated by a fleet of 11 sets of six-car CJ6-type EMUs, each accommodating up to 440 passengers. The EMUs will be eco-friendly and produce less noise than other EMUs.

Rail freight locomotive
One electric locomotive is capable of haulage up to 45 wagons with 3500 tonnes cargo. A fleet of 18 sets locomotives features container wagon, box wagon & open wagon.

Owner and operator
The ECRL will be owned by Malaysia Rail Link Sdn Bhd (MRL), a special purpose vehicle wholly owned by the Minister of Finance (Incorporated) (MoF Inc). It will be jointly operated and maintained by a 50:50 joint-venture between MRL and CCCC.

References

External links
 Suruhanjaya Pengangkutan Awam Darat (SPAD)
 Official Website
 First tunnel breakthrough six months ahead of schedule

Proposed rail infrastructure in Malaysia